Yiannis Boutaris (born 13 June 1942) is a Greek businessman and politician, former mayor of Thessaloniki.

Biography
Yiannis Boutaris was born in Thessaloniki in 1942, the son of winemaker Stelios Boutaris and Fanny Vlachos. His parents were from Albanian and Aromanian (Vlach) background. His mother's family has its roots in the town of Kruševo, now in North Macedonia, while his father's family originates from the town of Vithkuq, in Albania.

His primary education was at the Experimental elementary school of the Aristotle University of Thessaloniki, his secondary education at Anatolia College, and he graduated in chemistry from the Aristotle University of Thessaloniki in 1965 and in oenology from the Wine Institute of Athens in 1967. In his youth he was associated with the Communist Party of Greece (KKE).

From 1969 to 1996 he worked for the family wine company Boutari, based in Naoussa. He left the family company to create the Kir-Yianni wine company, based on two estates in abandoned village of Giannakochori and in Amyntaio, in 1998.

Boutaris has spoken several times openly about his struggle with alcoholism and his successful effort to quit drinking back in 1991. He is also a supporter of LGBT rights and the legalization of cannabis.

Mayor
During the last decade he is one of the prominent figures of progressive views and politics in Greece as well as a founding member of the ecological organization Arcturos.

In 2012 he was chosen as 'the best mayor of the world' for the month of October, by the City Mayors Foundation, based in the UK. 

In his program was the restoration of Agias Sofias Square and Eleftherias Square, as well as the construction of a Holocaust Museum in the city.

Boutaris also declared his wish to build an Islamic mosque, monuments to Thessaloniki's Jews and to the Young Turk Revolution. According to Boutaris, the construction of these monuments will attract Jewish and Turkish tourists to Thessaloniki, who will want to visit their fathers' hometown.   

On May 20, 2018 he was treated in hospital after being beaten up by a group of Greek ultra-nationalists angry over his appearance at a remembrance event for the Pontic Greek victims by the Ottomans during WWI. The hardliners claimed that Boutaris made a controversial remark on the issue ("I don't give a shit" if Kemal Atatürk killed Greeks or not"). Boutaris has repeatedly angered hardliners in Greece because he tried to facilitate relations between Greece and its neighbors and because he opposed nationalist views on the Macedonia naming dispute, the history of the Greco–Turkish relations and the Holocaust of the Jews in Greece. On the other hand he is widely respected amongst Muslims and ethnic Turks in Greece for his conciliatory efforts regarding the Greco-Turkish relations, the Jewish community, the Albanian community and the Greek Left.

References

External links

 City Mayors' Mayor of the Month for October 2012
 Official campaign website 
 KIR-YIANNI company website
 Local elections ‘10: Vintage Boutaris for Thessaloniki, article by George Gilson in Athens News, 13 September 2010

Movie "One Step Ahead" (2012) "Ena vima brosta" (original title) Directed by Dimitris Athyridis in 2012.

1942 births
Living people
Independent politicians in Greece
Businesspeople from Thessaloniki
Greek people of Aromanian descent
Aromanian politicians
Mayors of Thessaloniki
Greek chemists
Oenologists
Greek winemakers
20th-century Greek businesspeople
21st-century Greek businesspeople
21st-century Greek politicians
Politics of Thessaloniki
Greek Macedonians
Politicians from Thessaloniki